A True Tale of Robin Hood is Child ballad 154, featuring Robin Hood and, indeed, presents a full account of his life, from before his becoming an outlaw, to his death. It describes him as the Earl of Huntington, which is a fairly late development in the ballads. It definitively places him in Richard the Lionhearted's reign.

This ballad was written by the prominent 17th century broadside balladist Martin Parker, and published in 1632. By Parker's own account from it was based reliable historical sources, but more probably from the abundant literary and ballad sources then available. This account includes the unusual details that Robin Hood was given to castrating monks and that he operated in Lancashire as well as Yorkshire. Unlike many of the 17th century broadsides it stresses the tradition that Robin Hood actively aided the poor.

In the ballad's narrative, Robin Hood lives well as the Earl of Huntington, but is brought to penury by his spending and the enmity of the abbot of St. Mary's. He is outlawed, and his band lives by robbing, particularly the rich clergy, but they aid the poor. He catches the abbot, who then went to the king. The king offers a reward, but his men are either out-fought, or won over by Robin's courtesy. King Richard goes to Nottingham. Robin begs a pardon by letter, and the king is agreeable. Before he gets it, however, Robin takes a fever. He trusts a friar to bleed him (a common medical practice of the day), and the friar bleeds him to death. King Richard thinks the friar treacherous, and Robin foolish to have trusted him.

References

Francis James Child, "A True Tale of Robin Hood in The English and Scottish Popular Ballads, 5 vols., Boston and New York: Houghton, Mifflin and Company, (1882–98).

Child Ballads
Robin Hood ballads